BBC Radio Ulster is a Northern Irish radio station owned and operated by BBC Northern Ireland, a division of the BBC. It was established on New Year's Day 1975, replacing what had been an opt-out of BBC Radio 4. It is broadcast on radio across Northern Ireland and parts of the Republic of Ireland, and on digital television services across all of Ireland.

According to RAJAR, the station broadcasts to a weekly audience of 475,000 with a listening share of 19.1% as of December 2022.

Overview

It is the most widely listened to radio station in Northern Ireland, with a diverse range of programmes, including news, talk, features, music and sport. In the Q3 2021 RAJAR survey, the station had 517,000 weekly listeners, with total weekly listening hours of 5.5 million, beating its main local rivals (Cool FM, Downtown Radio, Downtown Country, U105, and Q Radio) on both of these metrics and, logically therefore, average weekly hours per listener (10.64). When taken together, the Bauer-owned stations (both Downtown stations and Cool FM) had higher total audience and listening hours per week, but lower average weekly hours per listener. The station had 135,000 more weekly listeners than its equivalent in Wales, BBC Radio Wales, despite serving a RAJAR population 1.1 million smaller. The station had the highest percentage reach and listening share, per corresponding survey area, of any BBC local, nations or national radio station, at 34% and 19.9% respectively.

It is broadcast from BBC Northern Ireland's Broadcasting House in Belfast. News bulletins are broadcast usually on the hour seven days a week from 6:30 am until midnight (on weekdays), from 6:45 am until midnight (on Saturdays) and from 7:00 am to midnight (on weekends, Christmas holidays, and Bank Holidays). It is available on 92-95 FM, Digital audio broadcasting and Freeview in Northern Ireland and across the UK on BBC Sounds and satellite/cable television. It is also available in the Republic of Ireland via Virgin Media, on smart speakers or on FM in counties bordering Northern Ireland. The station was available on medium wave on 1341 kHz and 873 kHz until 6 May 2021.

An opt-out of the station exists in Derry, BBC Radio Foyle, carrying alternative programming and news between 7:00am and 4:00pm weekdays with opt-out news bulletins at the weekend. The station is also broadcast on DAB Digital Radio, digital television and on the Internet. During the station's downtime, BBC Radio Ulster simulcasts BBC Radio 5 Live programming.

Funding
The BBC reported in the Annual Report for 2017/18 that Radio Ulster and Radio Foyle operated on a budget of £17.6 million with a 38% reach of the population and that the cost per hour of output was 5.8p.

Programmes

Good Morning Ulster
The Nolan Show
Talkback
Evening Extra
Blas
Country Afternoon with Hugo Duncan
Gardener's Corner
Across the Line
Jazz Club
On Your Behalf
Sounds Classical
Sunday Sequence
Radio Ulster Folk Club
Ralph McLean (BBC Radio Ulster)
The John Toal Show
The Foodie (BBC Radio Ulster)
Kerry McLean
Your Place and Mine
The Blame Game
Thought for the Day

Notable presenters

 Joel Taggart
 Chris Buckler
Sarah Brett
Stephen Nolan
Connor Philips
William Crawley
Hugo Duncan
Lynette Fay
 Declan Harvey
 Tara Mills
 Richard Morgan
Tina Campbell (newsreader)
Sean Coyle
Sara Neil (business reporter)
Linda McAuley
Tim McGarry
Kerry McLean
Brian D'Arcy
 Stephen McCauley
Ralph McLean
Angie Phillips (weather presenter)
Rigsy
John Toal
Linley Hamilton
Mickey Bradley

Previous presenters

Gerry Anderson 
Seamus McKee
Stephen Clements
Gerry Kelly
Wendy Austin
Karen Patterson
Conor Bradford
Sean Rafferty
Noel Thompson
Kim Lenaghan

References

External links

Ulster
Radio stations in Northern Ireland
Mass media in Belfast
Radio stations established in 1975
BBC Northern Ireland
1975 establishments in Northern Ireland
Music in Belfast